Tour 20 años (English: 20 Years Tour) is a concert tour by bachata superstar Juan Luis Guerra and 4:40 to support his 9th studio album Para Ti and to celebrate his 20th Anniversary of his debut. It was his first official tour since Areito World Tour in 1993.

Tour Dates

Notes

Box Office Data

References 

2004 concert tours
2005 concert tours
Juan Luis Guerra